Beaumys Castle, also known as Beams Castle, was a 14th-century fortified manor house in the parish of Swallowfield in the English county of Berkshire.

History
Beaumys Castle was a manor in the parish of Swallowfied, given to Sir Nicholas de la Beche in 1335. De la Beche received a licence to crenellate in 1338 and produced a fortified manor house. The castle was rectangular, protected by earthworks approximately 130m by 110m across, surrounded by a water-filled moat, with the castle accessed from an entrance to the north-west.

De la Beche died, leaving the manor to his wife Margery, who in turn remarried, to Thomas Arderne. On Arderne's death in 1347, however, John de Dalton and a small group of followers broke into the castle, where they killed Michael de Poynings, an important nobleman; terrified Lionel, the son of Edward III who was staying there at the time; stole £1,000 worth of goods, and seized Margaret, whom, as a wealthy widow, was forced to marry John.

The surrounding manor was broken up in 1420; the surviving earthworks are a scheduled monument.

See also
Castles in Great Britain and Ireland
List of castles in England

Bibliography
MacKenzie, James Dixon. (1896/2009) The Castles of England: Their Story and Structure. General Books LLC. .

References

External links 
 Investigation History

Castles in Berkshire
Borough of Wokingham